Unstable Ape Records was an Australian independent record label. Founded in Tasmania, it functioned out of Melbourne between 2001 and 2013. Unstable Ape's focus tended primarily towards indie rock and roll, but also expanded its interest to contemporary folk (Laura Jean, Marissa Nadler), jazz (Christopher Hale Ensemble) and world music (Zulya). In the early 2000s, the label became a home to many Melbourne indie rock bands. Albums are now all out of print although some are available to stream.
The label ceased trading in early 2013, its last release being Tales of Subliming by Zulya and the Children of the Underground.

Artists on Unstable Ape Records 
 At Sea
 Andrew McCubbin
 Jane Badler
 Bird Blobs
 Christopher Hale Ensemble
 Die! Die! Die!
 Jessica Says
 Laura Jean
 Love of Diagrams
 Marissa Nadler
 The Night Terrors
 Ninetynine
 No Through Road
 Ricaine
 Sandro
 Sea Scouts
 Sir
 SNAP! CRAKK!
 VulgarGrad
 Zulya Kamalova

See also 
 List of record labels
 Australian indie rock

Australian independent record labels
Indie rock record labels